William Johnson may refer to:

Entertainment
 Bunk Johnson (William Gary Johnson, 1879–1949), American jazz musician
 William Johnson (artist) (1901–1970), African-American painter of the Harlem Renaissance
 William Johnson (actor) (1916–1957), American actor
 William Jonathan Johnson, English-born organist, composer and organ builder in Sydney, Australia
 William Manuel Johnson (1872–1972), American jazz musician
 William L. Johnson, American actor and musician
 William Allen Johnson (1816–1901), American organ builder, founder of Johnson Organs
 Zip the Pinhead (William Henry Johnson, 1842–1926), American circus entertainer

Law
 William Johnson (judge) (1771–1834), Justice of the United States Supreme Court
SS William Johnson, a Liberty ship 
 William Moore Johnson (1828–1918), Irish barrister and judge
 William Paul Johnson (born 1959), U.S. federal judge

Military
 William Johnson, 1st Baronet (1715–1774), Anglo–Irish major general and British Indian agent
 William Johnson, 4th Baronet (1830–1908), English soldier and aristocrat
 William Henry Johnson (VC) (1890–1945), English recipient of the Victoria Cross
 Henry Johnson (World War I soldier) (William Henry Johnson, 1892–1929), American recipient of the Purple Heart and Medal of Honor
 William Johnson (Medal of Honor) (1855–1903), American recipient of the Medal of Honor
 William Johnson (Royal Navy officer) (1784–1851), Scottish naval captain

Politics

United States
 William Johnson (educator) (1895–1981), educator who served as Superintendent of Chicago Public Schools
 William A. Johnson Jr. (born 1942), mayor of Rochester, New York
 William Cost Johnson (1806–1860), Maryland congressman
 William Daniel Johnson (born 1954), white nationalist, attorney, and perennial candidate
 William E. Johnson (Nebraska politician) (1906–1976), lieutenant governor of Nebraska
 William E. Johnson (prohibitionist) (1862–1945), temperance movement leader
 William Elting Johnson (1837–1912), New York politician
 William F. Johnson (1819–?), mayor of Lynn, Massachusetts
 William H. Johnson (Wisconsin politician), Wisconsin state legislator
 William Johnson (Seneca County, NY) (1821–1875), New York State Senator and Civil War colonel
 William M. Johnson (1847–1928), New Jersey state senator
 William Richard Johnson (1875–1938), Illinois congressman
 William Samuel Johnson (1727–1819), United States Founding Father
 William Wallace Johnson (1813–1900), Wisconsin State Assemblyman
 William Ward Johnson (1892–1963), U.S. Representative from California
 William Wartenbee Johnson (1826–1887), Ohio politician and judge

United Kingdom
 William Johnson (MP for Kingston-upon-Hull) (by 1523 – 1553 or later), MP for Kingston–upon–Hull
 William Johnson (MP for Aldeburgh) (c. 1660–1718), MP for Aldeburgh, and for Orford
 William Augustus Johnson (1777–1863), English soldier and MP
 William Cowlishaw Johnson (1862–1943), member of London County Council
 William Johnson (Liberal-Labour politician) (1849–1919), English coal miner, trade unionist and Liberal–Labour politician
 William Johnson (trade unionist) (1866–?), English trade union leader and socialist activist
 William Johnson (MP for Bedford) (by 1513–1558), MP for Bedford and New Woodstock

Other countries
 William Dartnell Johnson (1870–1948), Labor politician from Western Australia
 William Johnson (Australian politician) (1871–1916), Australian politician
 Elliot Johnson (politician) (William Elliot Johnson, 1862–1932), Australian politician
 William James Johnson (Canadian politician) (1881–1949), Canadian politician in the Legislative Assembly of British Columbia
 William Granger Johnson, Fijian businessman and politician
 Sir William Gillilan Johnson, Irish politician and barrister
 William Johnson (Irish politician) (1760–1845), Irish politician, law officer and judge

Religion
 William Johnson (bishop) (1889–1960), Anglican Bishop of Ballarat, Australia
 William Bullein Johnson (1782–1862), American baptist minister, first president of the Southern Baptist Convention
 William Percival Johnson (1854–1928), Anglican missionary, translator of the Bible into Chinyanja
 William Robert Johnson (1918–1986), American Roman Catholic Bishop of Orange
 William Johnson (archdeacon) (1642–1698), Anglican priest
 William R. Johnson (minister), American minister of the United Church of Christ, first openly gay minister to be ordained in a historic protestant denomination

Science
 William Johnson (surveyor) (died 1883), British surveyor in India and governor of Ladakh
 William Arthur Johnson (1816–1880), amateur biologist and clergyman in Canada
 William Frederick Johnson (1852–1934), Irish naturalist
William B. Johnson (mathematician) (born 1944), American mathematician
 William Brooks Johnson (1763–1830), English physician and botanist
 William Summer Johnson (1913–1995), American chemist
 Mike Johnson (technologist) (William Michael Johnson), American pioneer in superscalar microprocessor design
 Bill Johnson (scientist), FRS (1922 – 2010) British engineer

Sports
 William Johnson (baseball) (1848–2013), American baseball player
 William Johnson (cricketer, born 1884) (1884–1941), Australian cricketer
 William Johnson (cricketer, born 1962), English cricketer
 William Johnson (handballer) (born 1953), American Olympic handball player
 William Johnson (rugby league) (1916–1997), rugby league footballer of the 1930s for Wales, and Huddersfield
 William Johnson (swimmer) (1947–2005), American freestyle swimmer at the 1968 Summer Olympics
 William Johnson (wrestler) (1901–1928), American wrestler
 William "Hootie" Johnson (1931–2017), American golfer
 C. William Johnson (1917–1993), American skeleton racer
 Judy Johnson (William Julius Johnson, 1899–1989), American baseball player
 Skinny Johnson (William C. Johnson, 1911–1980), American basketball player

Other professions
 William Johnson (Canadian author) (1931–2020), Canadian journalist and author
 William Johnson (barber) (1809–1851), free African American barber and businessman
 William Johnson (historian) (1909–1992), American journalist, sometimes credited William W. Johnson
 William Johnson (police officer), English police officer
 William D. Johnson (CEO) (born 1954), American chairman and CEO of Progress Energy
 William D. Johnson (journalist), American journalist and labor activist
 William Ernest Johnson (1858–1931), British logician
 William Henry Johnson (valet) (died 1864), President Abraham Lincoln's barber and valet
 William Johnson Cory (1823–1892), English educator and Uranian poet
 William R. Johnson (born 1949), chairman, president, and chief executive officer of the H. J. Heinz Company
 William Templeton Johnson (1877–1957), San Diego architect
 William Woolsey Johnson (1841–1927), American mathematician

See also
 Johnson (disambiguation)
William R. Johnson Coliseum, an arena in Nacogdoches, Texas

With middle names
 William B. Johnson (disambiguation)
 William Henry Johnson (disambiguation)
 William S. Johnson (disambiguation)

First name variations
 Billy Johnson (disambiguation)
 Bill Johnson (disambiguation)
 Will Johnson (disambiguation)
 Willie Johnson (disambiguation)

Surname variations
 William Johnston (disambiguation)
 William Johnstone (disambiguation)
 William Jonsson, Canadian politician activist